Commander Safeguard is Pakistan's first animated superhero Series produced by the Pakistani advertising agency IAL Saatchi & Saatchi and animated by Post Amazers.  The character is popular in Pakistan and in Mexico, where it is known as Capitan Escudo. The superhero is depicted as a representation of Safeguard (soap) who fights and defeats the germs who are led by a character called "Dirtoo"(Leader Of Germs). The cartoon was originally broadcast Pakistan's National Language in Urdu. It is one of the most popular children's animated television series in Pakistan.

The television series

Commander Safeguard's Mission: Clean Sweep, commonly known as Commander Safeguard, is the first Pakistani "3D Animated Series". It is sponsored by Procter & Gamble Pakistan,
The show was produced and animated by Post Amazers to promote hand washing habits among children. The animated series was created to augment the educational material on health and hygiene.

Episodes and seasons

To date, 12 episodes (excluding two independence day special episodes) varying in length from 15 to 20 minutes have been aired on many Pakistani TV channels. Episode 7, Commander Safeguard's Mission: Double Trouble was the longest episode ever which was 24 mins long, and divided into 2 parts. This episode marked Germander's debut appearance.

It is one of the most popular local TV shows for children in Pakistan. Episode 12, known as Commander Safeguard's Mission: Back To School, has the same name as 2010 10th Episode. Episode 12 is the shortest among all the episodes with only 13 minutes.

In July 2016, a short movie called 'Commander Safeguard's Mission: Clean Sweep: Jungle Main Mungle', was broadcast. It was the first short movie to be produced by Second Sense instead of Post Amazers. It ran for 15 minutes and featured Dirtoo trying to sicken children by adding germs to the food of children who did not wash their hands with soap. However Commander Safeguard defeated him.

Cast

Adaptations

In 2005, it was adopted in the Philippines as Captain Hugas and broadcasts in English-Filipino bilingualism.

In 2007, it was adopted in Mexico as Capitan Escudo.

On April 18, 2012, it was adopted in Africa (mostly Kenya) as the Africa's Local Super Hero - Commander Safeguard.

Production credits
Ahmed khalilullah, Vfx director, idea representer, managing director – Morocco
 Aziz Jindani, Brand Manager, Global franchise Procter & Gamble, United States
 Salman Butt, Brand Manager, Safeguard, Procter & Gamble, Pakistan
 Mubashara Khalid, Brand Manager, Safeguard, Procter & Gamble, Pakistan
 Ahmed Rizvi, Assistant Brand Manager, Safeguard, Procter & Gamble, Pakistan
 Saad Munawar Khan, Assistant Brand Manager, Safeguard, Procter & Gamble, Pakistan
 Tahir Malik, Director Marketing, Procter & Gamble Pakistan
 Imtisal Abbasi, Creative Director, IAL Saatchi & Saatchi

See also 

 List of Pakistani animated television series

References

External links 
 Official site
 Commander Safeguard's YouTube channel

Pakistani animated television series
Pakistani children's television series
Pakistani speculative fiction television series
Animated superhero television series